European Parliament elections were held in Greece on 18 June 1989 to elect the 24 Greek members of the European Parliament. Members were elected by party-list proportional representation.

Results
The 1994 European election was the third election to the European Parliament in which Greece participated. The European Parliament Election took place a few days before the national parliamentary elections and presaged the results of that election. The ruling PASOK under the leadership of Andreas Papandreou suffered strong losses against the opposition conservative New Democracy party and a coalition of the left and communist parties running as the Coalition of the Left and Progress. A new party Democratic Renewal reflected the organization of Costis Stephanopoulos who had left New Democracy and came in fourth, barely crossing the threshold.

References

Greece
European Parliament elections in Greece
1980s in Greek politics
Europe